Are You the One? is a German reality television series on the premium sector TVNOW and on the television channel RTL, in which young singles try to find love. The show premiered on April 14, 2020, on TVNOW and on May 6, 2020, on RTL.

A group of 10 single women and 10 single men are secretly paired into couples by Experts, via a matchmaking algorithm. Then, while living together, the contestants try to identify all of these "perfect matches". If they succeed, the entire group shares a prize of up to €200,000. Over the course of each season, the contestants go on dates with partners determined by competitions, and have the opportunity to learn in the "truth booth" if a given couple is a correct match. Once the truth booth confirms a perfect match, that couple will go to the honeymoon suite and will automatically be paired up for the remainder of the matching nights. At the end of each episode, the contestants pair up in a "matching night" and learn how many perfect matches they have, but not which matches are correct. The prize was reduced any time that the house failed to identify any matches other than those already confirmed via the truth booth.

Series overview

Seasons

Season 1 – South Africa 
Filmed in South Africa

Cast

Notes

  Edin joined in Episode 11.

Progress

Notes

 = Unconfirmed perfect match
 = This boy was not chosen in the matching night

Due to the blackout in the fourth matching night, the whole cast lost €20,000, lowering the total money at the end to €180,000, instead of €200,000.
Because of Edin joining the show at a later stage, the total money was raised by €20,000 in the finale, so the cast had a winning sum of €200,000 again.

Truth Booths

Notes

  Caroline had two matches, with Maximilian being the second one. Therefor Maximilian had to leave the show as well.

Season 2 – Greece 
Filmed in Greece

Cast

Notes

  Vanessa joined in Episode 10.

Progress

Notes

 = Unconfirmed perfect match
 = This girl was not chosen in the matching night

Truth Booths

Season 3

Cast

Progress

Notes 
 = Unconfirmed perfect match
 = This girl was not chosen in the matching night

Truth Booths

Season 4 
Filmed in Paros, Greece.

Cast

Progress 

 = Unconfirmed perfect match

Truth Booths

Notes

Spin Off - Reality Stars in Love

Season 1 – Greece 
Filmed in Greece.

Cast

Notes
Vanessa will move in at a later point during the show.

Progress

Notes 
 = Unconfirmed perfect match
 = This girl was not chosen in the matching night

After Francesco and Jules left the show, the money went down from 200.000 € to 180.000 €. For the truth booth in week 4, the contestant traded the truth booth for 70.000 €, so the winning sum was raised to 250.000 €. In week 5, the truth booth trade was worth 150.000 € and the trade was made, so the winning sum was 400.000 €. In week 8, due to a blackout, the winning sum was lowered to 350.000 €. In week 9, an offer was made to buy back a trooth booth match: Tommy & Melina. They took this deal and lost 200.000 €, lowering the winning sum to 150.000 €.

Truth Booths

Notes 

  Francesco had to leave the show due to a family emergency before the second truth booth and matching night could take place. Because of this, Jules was revealed as his perfect match and had to leave the show as well, and there was no matching night or truth booth in the second week.

Season 2 – Paros, Greece 
Filmed in Paros.

Cast

Progress

Notes 
 = Unconfirmed perfect match
 = This girl was not chosen in the matching night

Truth Booths

Notes 

  Lukas had to leave the show due to a family emergency before the second truth booth and matching night could take place. Because of this, Luisa was revealed as his perfect match and had to leave the show as well, thus there was no matching night in that week.

References

External links 
 Official Website on RTL
 Official Website on TVNOW

Germany
2020 German television series debuts
2020 German television series endings
2020s German television series
2020 German television seasons
RTL (German TV channel) original programming
German-language television shows
German reality television series
German television series based on American television series
Television shows filmed in South Africa
Television shows filmed in Greece